This is a list of historical structures in Isfahan Province, Iran.

Bazaars

Bridges

Caravanserais

Churches

Fire temples

Gardens

Hammams 

|

Houses

Imamzadehs

Khanqah

Libraries

Mausoleums

Minarets

Mosques

Museums

Palaces

Schools

Strongholds

Towers

Bibliography
 

 
Isfahan County
 
Buildings and structures in Kashan
Kashan County
Falavarjan County
Historical structures
Golpayegan County
Khomeyni Shahr County
Najafabad County
Tourist attractions in Isfahan